William Gordon Legge (January 20, 1913 – January 13, 1999) was an Anglican priest and bishop in Newfoundland and Labrador, Canada. He was the first bishop of the Diocese of Western Newfoundland, serving from 1976 to 1978.

He was ordained as a priest in 1938. After a curacy at Channel he held incumbencies at  Botwood and Bell Island. He was Archdeacon of Avalon from 1955 to 1968 when he became a suffragan bishop.

References

1913 births
1999 deaths
Anglican bishops of Newfoundland
Anglican bishops of Western Newfoundland
20th-century Anglican Church of Canada bishops